Jonathan Hoge Walker (July 20, 1754 – March 23, 1824) was a United States district judge of the United States District Court for the Western District of Pennsylvania.

Education and career

Born on July 20, 1754, near Hogestown, Silver Spring Township, Cumberland County, Province of Pennsylvania, British America, Walker graduated from Dickinson College in 1787 and read law in 1790. He was elected as a member to the American Philosophical Society in 1786. He served as a soldier in the Continental Army during the American Revolutionary War. He entered private practice in Northumberland, Pennsylvania from 1790 to 1806. He was President Judge of the Pennsylvania Court of Common Pleas for the Fourth Judicial District from 1806 to 1818.

Among his children was Robert J. Walker (1801−1869), who served as a U.S. senator from Mississippi and Secretary of the Treasury under President James K. Polk.

Federal judicial service

Walker was nominated by President James Monroe on April 20, 1818, to the United States District Court for the Western District of Pennsylvania, to a new seat authorized by 3 Stat. 462. He was confirmed by the United States Senate on April 20, 1818, and received his commission the same day. His service terminated on March 23, 1824, due to his death in Natchez, Mississippi.

References

Sources
 

1754 births
1824 deaths
Judges of the United States District Court for the Western District of Pennsylvania
United States federal judges appointed by James Monroe
19th-century American judges
Continental Army soldiers
Dickinson College alumni
Pennsylvania lawyers
United States federal judges admitted to the practice of law by reading law
Members of the American Philosophical Society